Constance Delaunay (1922 in Brussels – 11 July 2013 in Paris) was the pen name of Gilberte Lambrichs, French translator, playwright, novelist and short stories writer.

She was Georges Lambrichs's wife and Louise Lambrichs's mother.

She translated from German into French, works by Thomas Bernhard, Max Frisch, Fritz Zorn on behalf of éditions Gallimard.

Works 
1967: Une Mauvaise lecture, short stories, Paris, Éditions Gallimard, "Collection Blanche", 199 p. 
1977: La Donna - Olympe dort, theatre, Gallimard, series "Le Manteau d'Arlequin", 94 p. 
1984: Rose ou la Confidente, Gallimard, series "Le Manteau d'Arlequin", 115 p. 
1988: Les Rideaux, theatre, Gallimard, series "Le Manteau d'Arlequin", 98 p. 
1991: Leçon de chant, short stories,  Gallimard, Collection Blanche, 159 p. 
1994: Les Éventails de l'impératrice, short stories, Gallimard, Collection Blanche, 189 p. 
1996: Octavie dans tous ses états, novel, Gallimard, Collection Blanche, 163 p. 
1997: Le Portrait, theatre, Gallimard, Collection Blanche, 88 p. 
1998: Qu'est-ce qu'on attend ?, short stories, Gallimard, Collection Blanche, 207 p. 
 - Prix de la Nouvelle de l'Académie française 1999
1999: Conversations avec Federmann, novel, Gallimard, Collection Blanche, 254 p. 
2003: Autour d'un plat. Menus et propos, Gallimard, Collection Blanche, 213 p. 
2004: Sur quel pied danser, short stories, Gallimard, Collection Blanche, 150 p. 
 - Grand Prix Société des Gens de Lettres de la nouvelle 2004
2006! La Tsarine, Gallimard, Collection Blanche, 81 p.

References

External links 
 Constance Delaunay on the site of SGDL
 Constance Delaunay on the site of Éditions Gallimard
 Constance Delaunay on the site of the Académie française
 Constance Delaunay on Babelio
 Hommage to Contance Delaunay

1922 births
2013 deaths
21st-century French non-fiction writers
20th-century French women writers
French women novelists
French women short story writers
21st-century French short story writers
20th-century French novelists
German–French translators
Writers from Brussels
21st-century French women writers
20th-century translators